Ruston is a city in Pierce County, Washington, United States. The population was 1,055 at the 2020 census.

Although it is nearly indistinguishable from the adjacent city of Tacoma, the predominantly residential area still retains its status as a separate municipality long after it ceased to be a company town. The local government opted to reclassify Ruston as a city in late 2012.

History
In 1890 industrialist W.R. Rust established Tacoma Smelting & Refining Company and a company town for his employees, naming the place "Smelter". On October 22, 1906, residents voted to change the name to Ruston, in honor of Mr. Rust. Ruston was officially incorporated on November 10, 1906. It is surrounded on one side by Commencement Bay and all other sides the city of Tacoma. The primary industry for decades was the ASARCO copper smelting plant on the waterfront. The smelter and its landmark smokestack, however, were demolished in 1993. A massive Superfund cleanup at the site has been underway since the early 1990s. This area has been renamed "Point Ruston", as a large residential and commercial center on the waterfront is under construction as of 2017, which could add over 1,000 residents to the city.

The Ruston town council passed a measure to become a noncharter code city under Washington law in late 2012. Officials indicated that the "Town of Ruston" moniker will continue to be used, however.

Geography
Ruston is located at  (47.296906, -122.510513). It is surrounded on three sides by the city of Tacoma. To the north is Puget Sound.

Demographics

2010 census
As of the census of 2010, there were 749 people, 336 households, and 194 families living in the town. The racial makeup of the town was 87.0% White, 2.9% African American, 1.1% Native American, 2.7% Asian, 0.7% Pacific Islander, 0.9% from other races, and 4.7% from two or more races. Hispanic or Latino of any race were 6.0% of the population.

There were 336 households, of which 28.0% had children under the age of 18 living with them, 43.8% were married couples living together, 9.2% had a female householder with no husband present, 4.8% had a male householder with no wife present, and 42.3% were non-families. 30.1% of all households were made up of individuals, and 6.6% had someone living alone who was 65 years of age or older. The average household size was 2.23 and the average family size was 2.78.

The median age in the town was 39.5 years. 20.8% of residents were under the age of 18; 6.8% were between the ages of 18 and 24; 30.6% were from 25 to 44; 31.7% were from 45 to 64; and 10% were 65 years of age or older. The gender makeup of the town was 48.7% male and 51.3% female.

2000 census
As of the census of 2000, there were 738 people, 330 households, and 185 families living in the town. The population density was 2,879.9 people per square mile (1,095.9/km2). There were 355 housing units at an average density of 1,385.3 per square mile (527.2/km2). The racial makeup of the town was 87.26% White, 2.57% African American, 2.98% Native American, 2.30% Asian, 0.14% Pacific Islander, 1.08% from other races, and 3.66% from two or more races. Hispanic or Latino of any race were 3.79% of the population.

There were 330 households, out of which 22.7% had children under the age of 18 living with them, 41.8% were married couples living together, 9.4% had a female householder with no husband present, and 43.9% were non-families. 34.2% of all households were made up of individuals, and 8.5% had someone living alone who was 65 years of age or older. The average household size was 2.24 and the average family size was 2.87.

In the town the age distribution of the population shows 20.1% under the age of 18, 8.7% from 18 to 24, 33.5% from 25 to 44, 27.1% from 45 to 64, and 10.7% who were 65 years of age or older. The median age was 39 years. For every 100 females, there were 106.7 males. For every 100 females age 18 and over, there were 108.5 males.

The median income for a household in the town was $48,393, and the median income for a family was $54,167. Males had a median income of $36,932 versus $36,042 for females. The per capita income for the town was $22,565. About 7.7% of families and 13.1% of the population were below the poverty line, including 12.8% of those under age 18 and 5.1% of those age 65 or over.

Education

Ruston is served by Tacoma Public Schools, a public school district. Most of Ruston is zoned to Point Defiance Elementary School while parts in the east are zoned to Sherman Elementary School. All of Ruston is zoned to Truman Middle School and Silas High School (formerly Woodrow Wilson High School).

The magnet school Science and Math Institute (SAMi) is at Point Defiance Park, adjacent to Ruston. The school opened at the park in 2009 and moved to a new campus in 2015.

References

External links

Official website
Ruston  Documentary produced by Full Focus

Company towns in Washington (state)
North Tacoma, Washington
Cities in Pierce County, Washington
Cities in the Seattle metropolitan area
Cities in Washington (state)
Asarco
1906 establishments in Washington (state)